is a platform game made by Konami. It was released in Japan for the Famicom on 19 October 1990. It is considered a parody of the Castlevania series. A version for mobile phones was released on 30 June 2006 in Japan.

The game saw ports for the PlayStation 4, Xbox One, Nintendo Switch, and Microsoft Windows as part of the Castlevania Anniversary Collection which was released digitally on May 16, 2019, in all regions, with an English localization as Kid Dracula.

Plot
The self-proclaimed Demon King, Kid Dracula, has awoken from a long sleep, only to discover that the demon Galamoth has challenged him. Swiping his father's cape, it is up to Kid Dracula to set out on an adventure to destroy the monster, and retake his throne. After battling through dangers and demons, Kid Dracula defeats Galamoth. This causes him to become famous throughout the land, with all the monsters in Transylvania showing up at his castle wanting to be his friend.

Soundtrack
The soundtrack Konami Famicom Music Memorial Best Vol. 3, released on February 21, 1991, contains the soundtrack for Akumajō Special: Boku Dracula-kun, Ai Senshi Nicol and Wai Wai World 2: SOS! Parsley Castle. The music was composed by Konami Kukeiha Club.

A soundtrack album, Akumajo Special: Boku Dracula-kun Soundtracks was released by EGG Music, a division of D4 Enterprise, on August 14, 2014. It contains every background music and bonus track from the game, which were composed by Konami Kukeiha Club (by Satoko Miyawaki and Shinji Tasaka).

Reception
On release, Famitsu magazine scored the game a 25 out of 40.

Legacy
A game titled Kid Dracula was released for the Game Boy in 1993 and is both a remake and sequel of the original Akumajō Special: Boku Dracula-kun.

Notes

References

External links
 Konami Mobile (Japanese)

1990 video games
1990s horror video games
Mobile games
Nintendo Entertainment System games
Parody video games
Platform games
Single-player video games
Video games about children
Video games developed in Japan
Castlevania spin-off games